A Song Is a City is the second studio album by Australian rock band Eskimo Joe, released on 17 May 2004.
The album debuted and peaked at number 2 on the ARIA Charts.

At the ARIA Music Awards of 2004, the album was nominated for 6 awards, winning two; ARIA Award for Engineer of the Year and ARIA Award for Producer of the Year with Paul McKercher.

Making of the album
Eskimo Joe recorded the album with Paul McKercher on production. Vocalist and bassist Kavyen Temperley said on the Festival Mushroom Records website that the album is based on his experiences living in Fremantle. "The whole album is really about me, my friends, the people I love, and Fremantle. It's the stories that go on between us. It's similar to the people in every place all over the world. For me, that's what I'm writing about. I'm definitely not writing about New York City. I'm writing about Fremantle."

Track listing

2004 release

2020 release

1. Unlike the original release, "Come Down" does not cross fade into "From the Sea".

Charts

Weekly chart

Year-end charts

Certifications

Release history

References

ARIA Award-winning albums
Eskimo Joe albums
2004 albums
Albums produced by Ed Buller